BRSY College, Kanhauli also known as Bansropan Ram Bahadur Singh Yadav College, Kanhauli is a degree college in Patna district of Bihar, India. It is affiliated with Patliputra University. The college offers senior secondary education and undergraduate degrees in arts, science and conducts some vocational courses.

History 
The college was established in 1969 by Bansropan Ram Bahadur Singh Yadav. It got affiliation with Patliputra University in 2018.

Degrees and courses 
The college offers the following degrees and courses.
 Senior Secondary
 Intermediate of Arts
 Intermediate of Science
 Intermediate of Commerce 
 Bachelor's degree
 Bachelor of Arts
 Bachelor of Science

References

External links 
 

Colleges affiliated to Patliputra University
1969 establishments in Bihar
Educational institutions established in 1969
Patna district